"Love Your Shoes" is a song from British new wave band Furniture, which was released in 1984 as a non-album single on Premonition Records. The band re-recorded the song for their 1986 studio album The Wrong People, from which it was the second single. The song was written by Tim Whelan, Jim Irvin and Hamilton Lee.

Background
Speaking of the song's meaning to Record Mirror in 1986, guitarist Tim Whelan commented, "The statement 'Love Your Shoes' is the kind of smarmy comment you hear people making at parties. It's the kind of statement people make as you're sipping your beer." Lead singer Jim Irvin later said that the song was "about being crap at chatting someone up".

Release
The 1984 release of "Love Your Shoes" impressed Stiff and led them to sign the band in 1986. Their debut release on the label, "Brilliant Mind", broke the band commercially, reaching number 21 in the UK Singles Chart in July of that year. The follow-up single was a re-recorded version of "Love Your Shoes", which was expected to provide the band with a second hit.

"Love Your Shoes" generated strong airplay on UK radio, but internal issues at Stiff, including distribution problems, led the single to miss the top 100 of the UK Singles Chart and stall at number 101. In the time leading up to the single's release, Stiff declared bankruptcy and went into receivership before being bought by Jill Sinclair of ZTT. Irvin recalled in 2010, "The week before release it was very high in the airplay charts, beating the current Madonna single. People said it was a potential Number 1. Then Stiff cocked up the distribution."

Music video
The music video for the 1986 version was directed by Nicholas Brandt. In 2010, Irvin recollected the "stressful, 16 hour video shoot" and felt the concept behind the video took the song "way too literal and just made me look pervy". The house selected for filming the video was vacant at the time as its owner had recently died.

Critical reception
In a review of the 1984 recording, Jerry Smith of Music Week wrote, "A rich, seductive vocal over a shuffling beat, moody echoing guitar and organ creates a well executed indie single that combines melody with passion."

Reviewing the 1986 re-recording, Paul Massey of the Evening Express stated, "Almost too similar to 'Brilliant Mind', but Jim Irvin's vocals and racy chorus pull it through." Cath Carroll of New Musical Express commented, "There's enough of 'Pleasant Valley Sunday' in this to warrant several re-plays, but I still can't work out whether I'm charmed or irritated by the singer's out-of-breath cool. Maybe some of the sentiments are a little too self-conscious for comfort." Nancy Culp of Record Mirror wrote, "How can I resist such a dreamy record? Destined for blanket play on Janice Long."

In a review of the 1991 compilation She Gets Out the Scrapbook: The Best of Furniture, Chris Roberts of Melody Maker noted the song "show[s] off an astonishing fusion of pop and bitterness, joie de vivre and pessimism".

Formats

Personnel
Furniture
 Jim Irvin – vocals
 Tim Whelan – guitar
 Maya Gilder – keyboards
 Sally Still – bass
 Hamilton Lee – drums

1984 production
 Richard Preston – engineer on "Love Your Shoes" and "Throw Away the Script" (Instrumental Mix)
 John Fishlock, Gavin Greenaway – remixing on "Love Your Shoes"
 Furniture – producers of "Love Your Shoes" and "Escape into my Arms"

1986 production
 Mick Glossop – producer of "Love Your Shoes" and "Me and You and the Name"
 Furniture – producer of "Turnupspeed"
 Boz Boorer – clarinet on "Turnupspeed"
 Calum Colvin – cover picture

Charts

References

1984 songs
1984 singles
1986 singles
Furniture (band) songs
Songs written by Jim Irvin
Song recordings produced by Mick Glossop
Stiff Records singles